Vostaniyeh-ye Do (also Romanized as Vostānīyeh-ye Do; also known as Vosţānīyeh) is a village in Darkhoveyn Rural District, in the Central District of Shadegan County, Khuzestan Province, Iran. At the 2006 census, its population was 294, in 55 families.

References 

Populated places in Shadegan County